Catalyst is the third studio album by American progressive metal band Prototype. The album was released on September 11, 2012 via Nightmare Records. It is the band's first conceptual album and was their first studio album to feature drummer Pat Magrath as a permanent member of the band since Trinity (2002). Upon release, the album received mixed to positive reviews.

Track listing

Personnel
Credits are adapted from the album's liner notes.

Prototype
 Vince Levalois – vocals, guitar
 Kragen Lum – guitar
 Kirk Scherer – bass
 Pat Magrath – drums

Production
 Prototype – producers
 Neil Kernon – mixing
 Alan Douches – mastering

Artwork
 Travis Smith – artwork, package design and layout (with band)
 Sydney Levalois – band photography

References

External links
 

2012 albums
Prototype (band) albums
Science fiction concept albums